Plathymenia reticulata is a species of legume native to much of eastern South America. It is placed in its own genus, Platyhymenia, although other species have previously been recognised in that genus. Its wood is rot-resistant, and is widely used as a structural timber.

Description

Distribution and ecology
Plathymenia reticulata is a widespread tree in the cerrado and Atlantic Forest biomes of South America, but is not found in the more xeric caatinga biome.

The phenology of P. reticulata varies across its range; in São Paulo state, flowering occurs from July to October, but elsewhere it is can start as late as November, and end as late as December. Similarly, the time of fruiting varies from August–September to October–January. The pollinators are bees and other small insects, and the seeds are dispersed by the wind (anemochory).

Taxonomy
When he erected the genus in 1841, George Bentham originally described two species in Plathymenia – Plathymenia foliolosa and Plathymenia reticulata. Following work by Warwick and Lewis published in 2003, these are now considered synonymous, and Plathymenia is considered to contain a single species. The specific epithet  refers to the reticulate (net-like) leaf venation.

The name Echyrospermum, published by Heinrich Wilhelm Schott in 1822, is an earlier name for the same genus, but has been rejected under the International Code of Botanical Nomenclature.

Uses
The timber of P. reticulata contains terpenes that preserve the wood from termite attack and from rotting, even when exposed to the weather. It is the preferred timber for constructing dugout canoes in Brazil, and is widely used for anchors, fence-posts and for many other structural uses. The production of nectar and pollen for the pollinators make Plathymenia useful for apiculture.

References

External links

Mimosoids
Monotypic Fabaceae genera
Trees of South America
Taxonomy articles created by Polbot